Éva Földes (6 July 1914 – 9 July 1981) was a Hungarian author and Olympic bronze medalist. She was born in Szombathely and died in Balatonalmádi. During the London 1948 Summer Olympics, she competed in the 'epic works' category producing "Der Jugendquell" ("The Well of Youth"), which won her a bronze medal.

During World War II, she was interned in KZ Ravensbrück, KZ Flossenbürg, and KZ Mauthausen but survived.

References

External links
 Profile, sports-reference.com; accessed 24 March 2018.

1914 births
1981 deaths
Hungarian women writers
Olympic bronze medalists in art competitions
Mauthausen concentration camp survivors
Flossenbürg concentration camp survivors
Ravensbrück concentration camp survivors
Medalists at the 1948 Summer Olympics
Olympic competitors in art competitions